Allan Menzies (23 January 1845 – 8 May 1916) was a Scottish minister remembered as a religious author and translator. He was fluent in both English and German.

Life

He was born on 23 January 1845 in Edinburgh the third son of Allan Menzies WS (1805-1856), Professor of Conveyancing at Edinburgh University, and his wife, Helen Cowan (1806-1875), grand-daughter of Alexander Cowan. The family lived in a luxurious Georgian townhouse at 32 Queen Street.

He was educated at Edinburgh Academy and Stuttgart Gymnasium in Germany. He then took a general degree at St Andrews University gaining an MA in 1865 then studied Divinity at Edinburgh University gaining a BD in 1869. He befriended Andrew Lang at St Andrews.

He was licensed by the Presbytery of the Church of Scotland in Dunoon in 1870. He then became a town missionary in the city centre of Glasgow before becoming second charge at Athelstaneford, moving to Carluke in 1872. In May 1873 he was ordained at Abernyte west of Dundee.

In 1889 he was awarded a doctorate (DD) by Glasgow University and Queen Victoria suggested him as Professor of Biblical Criticism of St Andrews University in the same year and he was then in this role until death.

He left St Andrews around 1914/15 possibly due to his known German sympathies.

He died at Innellan on 8 May 1916. He is buried in the churchyard at St Andrews Cathedral.

Family

In July 1878 he married Mary Elizabeth Honey (1841-1916), daughter of Rev John Adamson Honey of Inchture.

They had two daughters: Helen Margaret Menzies (1879-1947); Frederica Lucy Anne Menzies (an author).

His brother Sir William John Menzies (1834-1905) was a lawyer and financier.

Publications

The Apostle Paul (translation of Baur's work) (1876)
The First Three Centuries of the Christian Church (1878)
Services for Sunday Schools (1879)
The Successors of the Great Physician (1880)
The Christian Priesthood (1880)
Pfleiderer;s Philosophy of Religion (1881)
Wellhausen's Prolegomena to the History of Israel (1885)
National Religion (1888)
A Critical Study of the New Testament (1890)
The History of Religion (1895 revised 1911)
The Earliest Gospel (1901)
The Religions of India: Brahmanism and Buddhism (1902)
The Christ of the Fourth Gospel (1909)
The Second Epistle to the Corinthians (1912)
A Study of Calvin and Other Papers (1918)

Periodicals

The Anti-Nicene Church Fathers (1897)
Review of Theology and Philosophy (1905 to 1915)
The Dictionary of the Bible (major contributor) 
Hasting's Encyclopaedia of Religion and Ethics
Mind

References

1845 births
1916 deaths
Writers from Edinburgh
People educated at Edinburgh Academy
Alumni of the University of Edinburgh
Academics of the University of St Andrews
Clergy from Edinburgh